Ŧ (lowercase: ŧ, Latin alphabet), known as T with a bar or T with stroke, is the 25th letter in the Northern Sámi alphabet, where it represents the voiceless dental fricative . In the SENĆOŦEN alphabet, it represents [s̪]. It is also used in the Hualapai alphabet. Other letters with a stroke include ǥ, ħ, đ, ł, and ø.

Computing code

See also 
 Bar (diacritic)

References

T 09